Eucalyptus micranthera, commonly known as the Alexander River mallee or milkshake mallee, is a species of mallee that is endemic to a small area along the south coast of Western Australia. It has smooth bark, lance-shaped adult leaves, flower buds in groups of seven or nine, creamy white flowers and more or less hemispherical fruit.

Description
The bark is smooth with a light to pinkish grey and yellow-grey colour and is shed in long thin ribbons. Flowering occurs between March and November and the flowers are white, often smelling like bananas.

Taxonomy and naming
Eucalyptus micranthera was first formally described by the botanist George Bentham in 1867 in Flora Australiensis, from specimens collected between "Eyre's Relief" and Israelite Bay by George Maxwell. The specific epithet (micranthera) is from the Greek micro- meaning "little" or "small" and the Latin anthera meaning "anther".

Distribution and habitat
Alexander River mallee occurs in an area along the south coast in the Great Southern and Goldfields-Esperance regions between around Nyabing in the west to around Cape Arid National Park in the east where it is found on flats and slightly undulating areas growing in sandy soils over or around laterite.

Conservation status
This eucalypt is classified as "not threatened" by the Government of Western Australia Department of Parks and Wildlife.

See also
List of Eucalyptus species

References

Eucalypts of Western Australia
Trees of Australia
micranthera
Myrtales of Australia
Mallees (habit)
Plants described in 1867
Taxa named by George Bentham